Devil's Hopyard State Park is a public recreation area located at the Eightmile River's Chapman Falls in the town of East Haddam, Connecticut.  The  state park includes facilities for hiking, fishing, bicycling, picnicking, and camping. It is managed by the Connecticut Department of Energy and Environmental Protection.

History

The park was the site of an attack by the Sons of Liberty, in 1775, on a mill owned by pro-British loyalists. After a portion of the broken millstone was found at the foot of the falls in 2002, a park sign (pictured at left) was erected to present details of the story.

The park's falls powered "Beebe's Mills" (named after the original owner) until the 1890s. The site was acquired by the state for use as a state park in 1919 at the prodding of A.G. Willard, a resident of Colchester who had expressed her concern with the extent of logging operations taking place in the area.

Name
At some time prior to 1800, there was a malt house on George Griffin's farm near a small tributary of the Eightmile River called Malt House Brook. The malt house was abandoned prior to 1814, but during the period of its operation Griffin grew hops in a small clearing—the "hopyard"—beside the road running through the area now called Devil's Hopyard.

There are a number of theories as to why the area was named “Devil's” Hopyard, ranging from a landowner named Dibble to supernatural explanations for the naturally occurring potholes near the falls. A sign in the park (pictured at left) has more on the legends of the etymology of the park's name.

Attractions
Other attractions include "mini falls" and three historic highway bridges listed on the National Register of Historic Places.

In the news
On March 26, 2012, a large brush fire struck the park. Efforts by firefighters from fourteen towns included burning out the area behind two threatened households. The fire consumed more than fifty acres over two days before authorities let it burn itself out. Officials proposed hikers as a possible cause of the blaze.  Six to 12 inches of soot, ash and other residue filled the area for some time thereafter.

References

External links

Devil's Hopyard State Park Connecticut Department of Energy and Environmental Protection
Devil's Hopyard State Park Map Connecticut Department of Energy and Environmental Protection

State parks of Connecticut
Parks in Middlesex County, Connecticut
Protected areas established in 1919
1919 establishments in Connecticut
East Haddam, Connecticut
Campgrounds in Connecticut